Erasing Sherlock is an original novel by Kelly Hale set in the Faction Paradox universe.

It is the last Faction Paradox novel to be published by Mad Norwegian Press, though not the last in the series. It was later republished by Hale, with references to Faction Paradox material removed, after the Mad Norwegian Press edition went out of print. Although taking place in a shared universe, either edition of the book is a stand-alone work that does not require any prior knowledge of Faction Paradox.

The novel was adapted by Kelly Hale from a previous work that she wrote, Erasing Sherlock Holmes, which won a $10,000 award in the Great North American Fiction Contest and was published as an e-book by PublishingOnline.com.  It has been described as a "fascinating (and undeservedly obscure) novel"  and reviewed in publications ranging from various Sherlock Holmes Society publications to the science fiction, Aeon Magazine.

Plot
"Seeking maid-of-all-work.  Master of Arts required. Opportunities for research in the field.  Must be able to relocate in time."  A doctoral candidate, in the guise of a housemaid working at 221B Baker Street, believes she is there to observe the 25-year-old Sherlock Holmes, and document his methods at the beginning of his career.  She soon learns she is operating under a serious misapprehension.

References

Faction Paradox
2006 British novels
British science fiction novels
Sherlock Holmes pastiches
Novels by Kelly Hale